Wairoa is a town and territorial authority district in New Zealand's North Island. The town is the northernmost in the Hawke's Bay region, and is located on the northern shore of Hawke Bay at the mouth of the Wairoa River and to the west of Māhia Peninsula. Wairoa is the nearest town to the Te Urewera protected area and former national park that is accessible from Wairoa via State Highway 38. It is the largest town in the district of Wairoa, and is one of three towns in New Zealand where Māori outnumber other ethnicities, with 62.29% of the population identifying as Māori.

History

Early history

Te Wairoa was originally a Māori settlement. The ancestral waka (canoe) Tākitimu travelled up the river and landed at Mākeakea, near where Tākitimu meeting house stands today. The Wairoa river (full name: Te Wairoa Hōpūpū Hōnengenenge Matangirau) was an important source of food as well as a transport route for the local iwi (people).

Te Reinga Falls is the starting point of Te Wairoa river, speak of the taniwha Hinekorako and Ruamano, who guided the Takitimu waka to Aotearoa. 
 
The Wairoa River Mouth (ngutu awa) is associated with two taniwha, Tapuwae and Te Maaha engaged in an ongoing struggle. 
There were a number of pā in close vicinity to the river, and the river was used as a major avenue for trading and commerce. The river was an important source of food and still continues to this day, including whitebait (Inanga), flounder (mohoao), mullet (kanae) and eel (tuna).

Early settlement in the area included a whaling station and trading post established by William Rhodes in 1839, dealing largely in flax. These establishments offered sufficient income and attraction. Wairoa's initial name was Clyde, but this was changed largely to avoid confusion with Clive near Napier and Clyde in the South Island. The north part of the town is called North Clyde. The town rose to prominence during the New Zealand Wars, during which time it was a garrison town.

The New Zealand government bought the land on which the town is built in 1864. This land was divided up and then sold as sections in 1866. The Wairoa Harbour Board was established in 1872. The Wairoa lighthouse was built between 1877 and 1878 and its beacon was first lit in 1878. The tower was reinforced in 1879 to provide greater stability after a storm damaged it. The Wairoa Borough Council was established in 1909.

The Napier to Wairoa railway line was started in 1911. Progress was intermittent with the Wairoa river railway bridge being built in 1930. The railway line was  completed in 1937. In April 1938, flooding hit the area, causing hundreds of slips which damaged the railway line. Work to restore the railway took place and  it was opened again for trains by the end of 1938 and fully utilised by 1939. This led to a decline in the use of the port at Wairoa, with the port used for the last time in 1942. The Wairoa Harbour Board was subsequently abolished in 1946.

Wairoa was home to a double murder in 1942 when Annie and Rosamond Smyth were killed in their home in the Salvation Army Hall in Wairoa. No one was ever charged with their murders at the time. Herbert Brunton was murdered in 1948 and this was also unsolved until Leo Silvester Hannan made a death bed confession to the crimes in 1962 while in prison serving a sentence for another murder.

The first bridge across the Wairoa river was built in 1888. It was subsequently damaged in the 1931 Hawke's Bay earthquake. A replacement bridge was built and this was completed in 1933. It was destroyed by Cyclone Bola in 1988. The third bridge was completed and officially opened by Queen Elizabeth II in 1990.

Modern history

In early March 1988, much of the North Island was severely affected by storm damage from Cyclone Bola.  In Wairoa, three days of heavy rain in the catchment areas caused severe flooding and damage including the loss of a 60-metre section of town's main bridge, cutting the town in half, and interrupting phone lines and the town's water supply. There was severe flood damage to farms, businesses, homes and the showgrounds.

In 1990 Wairoa won the last New Zealand Top Town Final in the original Top Town series and were the reigning champs until the series started again in 2009. Due to some confusion with a claim by Greymouth to be the last champions, Wairoa was not eligible for the new top town series and unable to defend their title.

There have long been tensions between the rival Mongrel Mob and Black Power gangs in Wairoa. In 1988, Wairoa's main street: Marine Parade was the scene of a fatal shooting of two Black Power associates. In 2003, a Mongrel Mob member was killed in February and a sniper shot a Black Power gang member dead in a van following an incident near the Wairoa Courthouse in November. In 2010, a Black Power gang member was shot in the face. Two Black Power members retaliated later that year and shot a Mongrel Mob member several times at a Wairoa petrol station. In 2021, gang related violence flared again with five separate incidents of guns being fired at homes in Wairoa. The police launched Operation Atlas to reduce tensions and stop the ongoing violence in Wairoa. In 2022, a shotgun blast hit the window of a child's bedroom (though the child was not present in the room) and a person received serious leg injuries. This was due to gang-crossfire where two homes were shot at in a drive-by shooting. 

In 2017, Rocket Lab built their rocket launch site on the Mahia Peninsula with Wairoa being the closet town to the site (83 kilometres away). This has led to a number of employment opportunities for Wairoa.

The Wairoa branch of the ANZ bank closed in 2018, and the BNZ and Westpac banks closed in 2021. Wairoa also lost its only dentist in 2020 forcing locals to visit Gisborne or Napier for dental treatment.

In February 2023, Wairoa was hit by Cyclone Gabrielle with it being described as "the most catastrophic weather event Wairoa has experienced in living memory".

Demographics

Wairoa had a population of 4,527 at the 2018 New Zealand census, an increase of 438 people (10.7%) since the 2013 census, and an increase of 213 people (4.9%) since the 2006 census. There were 1,548 households, comprising 2,223 males and 2,304 females, giving a sex ratio of 0.96 males per female. The median age was 36.4 years (compared with 37.4 years nationally), with 1,116 people (24.7%) aged under 15 years, 861 (19.0%) aged 15 to 29, 1,782 (39.4%) aged 30 to 64, and 768 (17.0%) aged 65 or older.

Ethnicities were 43.0% European/Pākehā, 69.5% Māori, 4.4% Pacific peoples, 3.5% Asian, and 1.1% other ethnicities. People may identify with more than one ethnicity.

The percentage of people born overseas was 8.3, compared with 27.1% nationally.

Although some people chose not to answer the census's question about religious affiliation, 34.7% had no religion, 39.4% were Christian, 14.6% had Māori religious beliefs, 0.2% were Hindu, 0.9% were Muslim, 0.5% were Buddhist and 1.3% had other religions.

Of those at least 15 years old, 285 (8.4%) people had a bachelor's or higher degree, and 1,002 (29.4%) people had no formal qualifications. The median income was $21,500, compared with $31,800 nationally. 183 people (5.4%) earned over $70,000 compared to 17.2% nationally. The employment status of those at least 15 was that 1,341 (39.3%) people were employed full-time, 459 (13.5%) were part-time, and 273 (8.0%) were unemployed.

Wairoa had a population of 3348 people in 1951, which increased to 3796 people in 1956 and; 4301 in 1961.

Economy

Meat processing 
The meat processing plant in Wairoa was first established in 1916. Originally owned by the Wairoa Co-operative Meat Company, the building was destroyed by a fire on 5 February 1931. The AFFCO group bought it in 1990. The meat processing plant employs around 650 people in their peak season. They process mutton, lamb, goat and beef and export much of the product. There is also a rendering plant onsite producing bone meal and tallow. In 2015 the Employment Court deemed a lockout of 170 workers at the plant illegal. Management had locked workers out for five months who refused to sign individual contracts. In 2018, the Court of Appeal ruled that those workers locked out should be paid lost wages. In February 2020, a worker at the plant was killed on the job, crushed by pallets. Worksafe closed the plant briefly and investigated the incident.

Forestry 
Forestry is playing an increasing role in the economy of Wairoa. Many farms are being converted to forests which earn carbon credits. There are concerns that the loss of farming will shrink the size of the town's economy and lead to depopulation.

Amenities and events

Events

Since 2005, Wairoa has been host to the annual Wairoa Māori Film Festival, New Zealand's premiere Maori and indigenous film festival, which has hosted film makers from across the nation and around the world. In 2015, the festival began to be hosted in part at the newly revitalised Gaiety Cinema and Theatre, which had recently been fitted out with one of the world's most advanced theatre sound systems.

A & P show 
The Wairoa  Agricultural & Pastoral Society was established in 1899 and held its first show next to the Frasertown Domain. A variety of events are run at the annual show including rodeo, dog trials, competition sheep shearing, show jumping and other equestrian events. The 2022 edition, due to be held in January was cancelled due to Covid-19 restrictions.

Wairoa museum 
The Wairoa museum, located at 142 Marine Parade, is housed since 2001, in what was the ANZ bank building. The collection focusses on local and Maori history and includes a Maori flag from the Maori land wars in 1865. In 2016, the museum expanded its exhibition space and refurbished the galleries and developed a new interactive "discovery space".

Wairoa library 
The Wairoa Centennial Library was built in 1960. It was designed by the Wellington Architectural firm Porker & Martin. The Wairoa Rotary Club raised $20,000 to built an extension to the library in 1974 to house a museum. Further work to the library was completed in 1988 and 2003. The library is located at 212 Marine Parade.

Golf clubs 
Wairoa is home to two golf courses. The Wairoa Golf Club is located 5 kilometres to the north of central Wairoa. The Mahia Golf Club is located on the Mahia Peninsula and has a nine-hole course.

Wairoa community centre 
The Wairoa community centre is home to an indoor stadium. Indoor soccer, netball, cricket, badminton, volleyball and basketball can be played. There is also a gym and a 25-metre indoor swimming pool. It is located at 33 Marine Parade.

Marae

The township includes a number of marae (meeting grounds) and wharenui (meeting houses) for the local iwi (tribe) of Ngāti Kahungunu and its hapū (sub-tribes).

In October 2020, the Government committed $1,949,075 from the Provincial Growth Fund to upgrade Ruataniwha, Hinemihi, Hurumua, Iwitea, Kihitu, Taihoa, Tākitimu-Waihirere, Tawhiti A Maru, Te Mira and Whakakī, and 14 other Ngāti Kahungunu marae, creating 164 jobs.

Infrastructure

Re-investment in central business district 
In January 2020, the Government announced funding of $6.1 million to support rebuilding in the central business district.  The funding will support a Wairoa Integrated Business and Tourism Facility, a Wairoa Digital Employment Programme and a Wairoa Regional Digital Hub.

The three waters 
In 2020, the Wairoa District Council applied to the Regional Council for resource consents for the Wairoa town wastewater scheme.  Wastewater is discharged to an estuary in the lower reaches of the Wairoa River, through an outfall about 100 metres from the shore.  A panel of independent commissioners reviewing the application noted that the discharge to water is not culturally acceptable to the community, but that land-based discharge is currently unaffordable and the council has not secured suitable land. The review concluded that the town "had a very significant problem" and urged the council to get help from central government.

During 2021, the Government consulted with regional and district councils about proposed major reforms for the three waters sector nationwide, involving the proposed transfer of assets from 67 local authorities to four new large entities.  The mayor of Wairoa, Craig Little criticised the proposed reforms and expressed concerns about the loss of local representation and control.

Hospital 
Wairoa Hospital (Te Hauora o te Wairoa / Wairoa Health) is a 12-bed hospital that provides both maternity and acute medical inpatient beds. It is run by the Hawke's Bay District Health Board. Also located at Te Hauora o te Wairoa / Wairoa Health is a general practice, an emergency department (level 2), radiology and laboratory services, mental health and addiction services and a number of outpatient clinics. it is located at 36 Kitchener Street, Wairoa.

Airport 
The Wairoa airport is located on Airport Road on the northern side of Wairoa. The runway is 914 metres long. The airport is home to the Wairoa Aero Club.

Road 
Wairoa is connected south west to Napier and north east to Gisborne by State Highway 2. Connecting Wairoa to the northwest is State Highway 38 which travels past Lake Waikaremoana where it joins State Highway 5.

Rail 
The Napier to Gisborne section of the Palmerston North-Gisborne railway line was mothballed in 2012 after being damaged by a storm. It was repaired and reopened between Napier and Wairoa in January 2020 with funding of $6.2 million from the Provincial Growth Fund. Freight services ran to transport logs to Napier Port. The service was suspended after six return trips as a result of the impact of COVID-19 on the forestry sector. It reopened in November 2020.

Education

Wairoa College is a Year 7–13 co-educational state high school.

Wairoa Primary School is a Year 1–6 co-educational state primary school.

Tiaho Primary School is a Year 1–6 co-educational state primary school.

TKKM o Ngati Kahungunu o Te Wairoa is a Year 1–13 co-educational Māori immersion school.

St Joseph's School is a Year 1–8 is co-educated state integrated Catholic primary school.

Notable buildings

St Andrews 
St Andrew's Church (Presbyterian-Methodist) is located at 98 Queen Street. It is a category two historic place. it was most likely built between 1932 and 1935.

St Peters 
St Peter's Catholic Church is located at 64 Queen Street. It is a category two historic place. One of the oldest buildings in Wairoa, it was completed in 1882. Built out of timber, it is an important example of New Zealand Gothic Revival church architecture.

Wairoa Meat Company 
The Wairoa Meat Company building, located on Marine Parade, is a category two Historic Place. Built between 1915 and 1920, highlights the long association between Wairoa and the meat processing industry. It survived the 1931 Napier earthquake and in 2020 received a $200,000 grant for seismic strengthening.

Wairoa County Chambers 
The Wairoa County Chambers, located on Queen Street, is a category two Historic Place.

Gaiety Cinema and Theatre 
The Gaiety Cinema and Theatre, located at 252 Marine Parade was built in 1925. It was destroyed in the 1931 Hawkes Bay earthquake. It was subsequently rebuilt in 1932 in an Art Deco style. It has hosted many events including screenings of movies, concerts, political rallies and boxing matches. It closed in 1960 and was used for a variety of purposes including as a super market and basketball court. In 1998, work was completed to restore it to its former use as a cinema and theatre and it was reopened in 2000. Finances forced it to close in 2009. It reopened in 2015 with support from the Wairoa District Council. It has a capacity of 250 patrons.

Notable people
 Pana Hema Taylor, actor
 Esme Tombleson, politician
 Mere Whaanga, author and historian
 Katarina Kawana, musician
 Derek Fox, broadcaster and former mayor of Wairoa

References

External links
 Wairoa Help and Information Centre
 Wairoa i-SITE Visitor Information and Travel Centre
 Official website of Wairoa District Council

 
Territorial authorities of New Zealand
Whaling stations in New Zealand
Whaling in New Zealand
Populated places in the Hawke's Bay Region
Wairoa District
Populated places around Hawke Bay